David W. Snoddy is a United States Air Force major general who has serves as the assistant deputy chief of staff for cyber effects operations of the U.S. Air Force. He previously served as the deputy director for current operations of the United States Cyber Command.

Military career 

In 2022, Snoddy was promoted to major general and assigned as the assistant deputy chief of staff for cyber effects operations of the United States Air Force.

References

External links 
 

Living people
Year of birth missing (living people)
Place of birth missing (living people)
United States Air Force generals
Brigadier generals